No More Women may refer to:
 No More Women (1934 film), an American pre-Code adventure film
 No More Women (1924 film), an American silent comedy film
 No More Women, a game on the British television panel game We Need Answers